Bryan Stinespring (born October 12, 1963) is an American football coach.  He is the Activities Director for Alleghany High School in Covington Virginia. He was the assistant head coach and offensive line coach at the University of Delaware, as well as formerly the run game coordinator and offensive line coach at James Madison University from 2016 to 2017.  He was previously the tight ends coach (1993–1997, 2006–2015) and recruiting coordinator for the Virginia Tech Hokies football program. He was a full-time member of head coach Frank Beamer's staff from 1993-2015.  Throughout his tenure in Blacksburg, Stinespring held a number of other positions including offensive line coach (1993–2005), recruiting coordinator (1994–2001), assistant head coach (2001) and offensive coordinator (2002–2012).

Following Beamer's retirement at the end of the 2015 season, Stinespring joined the staff at his alma mater James Madison where he served as offensive line coach and run-game coordinator. At the end of the 2022 season, Stinespring was named associate head coach and offensive assistant at VMI.

Criticism
Stinespring had faced criticism from the fans and a player for offensive output during his time as offensive coordinator, which compares poorly with that of his predecessors under Frank Beamer.

In 2008, sports columnist Norm Wood has commented that Stinespring's offensive production in recent years has been "abysmal", and that he heard fans chanting "Fire Stinespring" before one home game.
 
While Stinespring faced criticism for offensive production, he has also been praised for his abilities as a recruiter.  Players have also expressed their appreciation for Stinespring as a personal coach, and for his ability to recruit talented new players to the school.

Statistics
Below are Virginia Tech's offensive statistics during Stinespring's time as offensive coordinator.

References

External links
 Old Dominion profile

1963 births
Living people
James Madison Dukes football coaches
James Madison Dukes football players
Old Dominion Monarchs football coaches
Virginia Tech Hokies football coaches
High school football coaches in Virginia
People from Clifton Forge, Virginia